Olga Jovičić (Užička Požega, 3 February 1921 — Prozor 11 July 1942) was a People's Hero of Yugoslavia.

Bibliography 

She was born in 1921 in Užička Požega. She ended elementary school and high school in Kraljevo, and then in 1939 she moved to study in Belgrade. At university he quickly broke out in the forefront of advanced students. The membership of the Communist Party of Yugoslavia was admitted in 1940. Occupying police arrest after Germany attacked the Soviet Union in June 1941. Despite she was abused in prison, she held up well there. In August 1941, he escaped from prison with one comrades. Then came the Kraljevacki partisan detachment "Jovan Kursula". Olga and her friend were the first partisan detachment in Kraljevo. The Detachment becomes head of the agitation and propaganda. She went to the villages. There she held speeches and meetings.
She was appointed political commissar of the First Company of the Fourth (Kraljevo) Battalion. Olga was the first woman political commissar of the People's Liberation Army of Yugoslavia.
When the enemy besieged partisan units in Romania, in the winter of 1942, and sought to destroy them, the first company of the fourth battalion was tasked to close the direction of Rogatica. Olga was sick with a high fever, a company commander and fighters are hardly persuaded to remain in the clinic. After a few kilometers Olga troop arrived, she could not stay in the clinic until her troop goes to such an important and responsible task. That night, along with the company cutting its way through the snowdrifts on Romania to Jahorina, and participated in all the battles.
When she returned to the position of her troop from undetermined way on her was fired machine-gun burst. She fell seriously wounded. Her friends have taken her to village Duge where she soon succumbed to wounds.
By the decree of the Presidium of the National Assembly of the Federal Republic of Yugoslavia, on 20 December 1951, she was declared a national hero. One street in Belgrade suburb Kotež has her name.

Literature 

 ŽENE Srbije u NOB / Rada Vujičić...[i dr.]. - Beograd : Nolit, 1975 (Beograd : "Srbija"). 
 VOJNA enciklopedija. 2, Brdo-Foa / - 2. izd. - Beograd : Redakcija Vojne enciklopedije, 1971 (Ljubljana : Mladinska knjiga).
KO je ko u Jugoslaviji : jugoslovenski savremenici / - Beograd : Hronometar, 1970 (Čakovec : "Zrinski").

Women in the Yugoslav Partisans
Yugoslav Partisans members
1921 births
1942 deaths
Serbian women
People from Požega, Serbia
20th-century Serbian women
20th-century Serbian people
Recipients of the Order of the People's Hero